Floscaldasia azorelloides is a species of flowering plant in the family Asteraceae. It is found only in Ecuador. Its natural habitat is high-altitude grassland. It is threatened by habitat loss.

References

Further reading
 Sklenar, Petr; Harold Robinson. (2000) "Two New Species in Oritrophium and Floscaldasia (Asteraceae: Astereae) from the High Andes of Ecuador" (Abstract Novon 10 (2): 144–148.

azorelloides
Flora of Ecuador
Vulnerable plants
Taxonomy articles created by Polbot